Michael Patrick Forbes (born July 16, 1952) is an American former politician from the state of New York. Forbes represented a Long Island district in the United States House of Representatives from 1995 to 2001, first as a Republican (until 1999) and then as a Democrat. He was an influential member of the House Appropriations Committee throughout his tenure on Capitol Hill. Forbes left Congress after being defeated in the 2000 Democratic primary election. He subsequently moved to Texas, where he has since devoted his life to service in the Roman Catholic Church. In 2013, he was ordained a  permanent deacon by Bishop Joe S. Vasquez.

Early life and career
Michael Patrick Forbes of Round Rock, Texas and Quogue, Long Island, was born on 16 July 1952 at Riverhead, Long Island, New York, to Kenneth and Jane (née Morrissey) Forbes. He is the grandson of Carrie Bowman, a Broadway actress, and T. Harold Forbes, an actor and Vaudeville song and dance man who became a well-known newspaper publisher in New Rochelle and Long Island, New York. Forbes graduated from the SUNY Albany, Saint Paul University, the University of Ottawa and the University of Mary. He received an honorary Doctor of Law from Long Island University. Forbes got his start in politics as an assistant to New York State Assembly Speaker Perry B. Duryea, Jr. He was a senior aide and close advisor to Republicans U.S. Sen. Al D'Amato and U.S. Rep. Connie Mack. In 1979, Forbes joined the George H.W. Bush presidential campaign as a campaign operative in Upstate New York and again, in 1987, successfully campaigned statewide in Maine for Bush to succeed Ronald Reagan. President Bush appointed Forbes to a senior post at the United States Small Business Administration in 1989. He served four years, leaving in 1993 when the Clinton administration came into office.

Forbes remains involved as a volunteer, board member, and committee member of the not-for-profit Camp Agawam, an alumni-owned summer camp in Raymond, Maine. He and his older brother, Ken, his father, Ken Sr., and Forbes’s sons, Ted, Sam, Max, and most of their male relatives spent their summers on Agawam’s Crescent Lake dating from the camp’s founding in 1919. Forbes first attended Agawam in 1965.

Congress 
In 1994, Forbes ran on three ballot lines for the House of Representatives: Republican, Conservative, and Right to Life. Campaigning as a fiscal conservative, he defeated incumbent George Hochbrueckner by six percentage points. Forbes got a seat on the powerful Appropriations committee, unusual for a freshman Representative, after defeating an incumbent congressman and because of his close ties to the new GOP House Speaker Newt Gingrich. In December 1996, after Gingrich was cited for gross campaign irregularities, Forbes became the first Republican to announce he was not going to vote for Gingrich for speaker. Forbes voted for moderate Republican candidate Jim Leach instead. Despite his record of support for a number of President Bill Clinton's programs, particularly his health insurance for all Americans, Forbes voted to impeach Clinton in 1998.

Party switch
On July 17, 1999, Forbes switched to the Democratic Party after chastising national Republicans for being "tone deaf" to the needs of average Americans. While embraced nationally by President Bill Clinton, House Democratic Leader Dick Gephardt, U.S Senators Ted Kennedy and Max Cleland and other Senate and House Democrats, New York's liberal Democrats (particularly chairwoman Judith Hope) refused to welcome Forbes into the Democratic Party because he would not change his long-held belief in the sanctity of human life and push to prohibit abortion.

Activists in the Suffolk County Democratic Party  recruited a 71-year-old librarian, Regina Seltzer, to challenge Forbes in the 2000 Democratic primary. Seltzer won a court ruling halting state Democratic Party ads for Forbes. Both the national and state Republican parties secretly funneled $250,000 to Seltzer’s primary, which she won by just 35 votes. Fireworks company executive Felix Grucci, a Republican, beat Seltzer and took Forbes's place in the Congress. Grucci served a single term in Congress, being defeated in 2002 by Democrat Tim Bishop, who served until 2015.

Career after Congress
Forbes is married to Barbara Ann (Blackburn) Forbes and has four children and seven grandchildren. In his post-Congress years, Forbes worked as a public relations executive, opening his own firm in 2001. His clients included defense industry contractors, financial services, Internet payment providers, non-profit children's home, and other small businesses seeking Federal legislative relief and appropriations. He has also blogged for the Huffington Post.

In 2007, Forbes and his wife moved to Round Rock, Texas. In 2008, he entered five years of formation and theological study in the Diocese of Austin to become a permanent deacon in the Roman Catholic Church. He was ordained clergy in the Roman Catholic Diocese of Austin by Bishop Joe S. Vásquez on April 13, 2013. He serves at Saint William Catholic Church in Round Rock.

In 2016, Forbes earned both ecclesiastical and civil degrees in canon (Church) law (the iuris canonici licentiate (J.C.L.) and a Master in Canon Law (M.C.L.) from Saint Paul University and the University of Ottawa, respectively.  He proceeded to complete a Master in Science in Bioethics (MSBE) from the University of Mary at Bismarck, North Dakota, in 2021 to better serve his parish and diocese in critical life issues. In addition to serving as a judge on the ecclesiastical court of the Diocese of Austin, Forbes was appointed by Bishop Vasquez as Vice Chancellor for the Diocese of Austin.  He is a member of the Canon Law Society of America, the Canon Law Society of Great Britain and Ireland, the Canon Law Society of Australia New Zealand and the Canadian Canon Law Society.

See also
 List of American politicians who switched parties in office
 List of United States representatives who switched parties

References

External links
 
 Michael P. Forbes Biography at jhu.edu
 Rep. Michael Forbes May Switch Parties
 Parties Switched and Friends Lost, but No Regrets
 New Tally Confirms an Upset in Primary

1952 births
Living people
People from Riverhead (town), New York
University at Albany, SUNY alumni
Republican Party members of the United States House of Representatives from New York (state)
Democratic Party members of the United States House of Representatives from New York (state)
20th-century American politicians
American Roman Catholic deacons
20th-century Roman Catholics
21st-century Roman Catholics
Catholics from New York (state)
United States congressional aides
Members of the United States House of Representatives from New York (state)
Members of Congress who became lobbyists